German submarine U-167 was a Type IXC/40 U-boat of Nazi Germany's Kriegsmarine built for service during World War II.
Her keel was laid down on 12 March 1941 by the Deutsche Schiff- und Maschinenbau AG in Bremen as yard number 706. She was launched on 5 March 1942 and commissioned on 4 July with Kapitänleutnant Kurt Neubert in command.

The U-boat's service began with training as part of the 4th U-boat Flotilla. She then moved to the 10th flotilla on 1 December 1942 for operations. She was a member of three wolfpacks.

She was scuttled on 6 April 1943.

Design
German Type IXC/40 submarines were slightly larger than the original Type IXCs. U-167 had a displacement of  when at the surface and  while submerged. She had two shafts and two  propellers.

U-167 was fitted with six  torpedo tubes (four fitted at the bow and two at the stern), 22 torpedoes, one  SK C/32 naval gun, 180 rounds, and a  SK C/30 as well as a  C/30 anti-aircraft gun. The boat had a complement of forty-eight.

Service history

The boat moved from Kiel in Germany to Bergen in Norway in December 1942.

First patrol
The submarine's first patrol took her from Bergen on 21 December 1941, across the North Sea and into the Atlantic Ocean through the gap between Iceland and the Faroe Islands. U-167 lost a man overboard in mid-Atlantic on 8 January 1943. She arrived in Lorient in occupied France, on the 16th.

Second patrol and loss
She then sailed round the Azores before approaching the northwest African coast. She sank the Lagosian from convoy RS-3 southeast of the Canary Islands on the 28th.

U-167 was scuttled near the Canary Islands following an attack by a Lockheed Hudson of No. 233 Squadron RAF on 6 April 1943.

Post-war
The boat was raised in 1951 and transferred to Spain. Before being broken up, she was used for filming.

Summary of raiding history

References

Bibliography

External links

1942 ships
German Type IX submarines
U-boats commissioned in 1942
U-boats sunk in 1943
Ships built in Bremen (state)
World War II submarines of Germany
Maritime incidents in April 1943